Viktor Viktorovych Shemchuk (born 4 November 1970, in Ternopil, Ukraine), is a Ukrainian politician.

In 2007 he served as a Presidential representative of Ukraine in Crimea.

References

External links
 Siumar, V. How to lose Crimea in legal way (Як втратити Крим правовим шляхом). Mirror Weekly. 14 November 2008.
 Viktor Shemchuk at LB.Dossier

1970 births
Living people
Politicians from Ternopil
Presidential representatives of Ukraine in Crimea
University of Lviv alumni
General Prosecutors of Ukraine
Governors of Lviv Oblast
Sixth convocation members of the Verkhovna Rada